Angela Tucker is an American writer, and Emmy and Webby award winning producer/director. She is best known for her work on Black Folk Don't, (A)sexual and All Styles.

Life and career
Tucker graduated from Wesleyan University with a BA, and from Columbia University with an MFA. She was a Sundance Institute Women Filmmakers Initiative fellow. She has received grants from the MacArthur Foundation, the Ford Foundation, Tribeca All Access and the Brooklyn Arts Council. She was awarded an Artist Residency at Yaddo in Saratoga Springs.

Tucker was the Director of Production at Big Mouth Films, a social issue documentary production company. In 2010, Tucker left Big Mouth Productions to focus on her own film production company, TuckerGurl Inc. Her directorial debut under her own company was the feature documentary, (A)sexual, about people who experience no sexual attraction, premiered at Frameline Film Festival. In 2013, she directed and produced the documentary series, Black Folk Don't, featured in Time Magazine's “10 Ideas That Are Changing Your Life”.

Tucker's directorial debut feature film, All Styles, starring Dushaunt Fik-Shun Stegall and Heather Morris, premiered on Showtime. In 2018, she directed a short film, All Skinfolk, Ain’t Kinfolk,  premiered at Doc NYC. She is also slated to direct the upcoming feature film, Paper Chase..

Filmography

References

External links
 
 

Living people
American women film directors
American women screenwriters
Year of birth missing (living people)
Wesleyan University alumni
Columbia University alumni
21st-century American women